Fernando Cepeda Ulloa (born 28 January 1938) is a Colombian political scientist, professor and diplomat. He has served as Ambassador of Colombia to the United Kingdom, to France, and to Canada, as Permanent Representative of Colombia to the United Nations and to the Organization of American States, and as Chargé d'affaires of the Colombian Legation to the United States as Minister Plenipotentiary.

Diplomatic career
On 9 July 1988, President Barco reassigned Cepeda once again, but this time appointing him Ambassador of Colombia to the United Kingdom, where he travelled to the next day and presented his Letters of Credence to Her Majesty Elizabeth II Queen Elizabeth II of the Commonwealth Realms on July 11 in a ceremony at Buckingham Palace.

On 26 December 1990, President César Gaviria Trujillo announced that he was appointing Cepeda to serve as the 21st Permanent Representative of Colombia to the United Nations; Cepeda presented his Letters of Credence to the UN Secretary-General Javier Pérez de Cuéllar on 2 January 1991 at the United Nations Headquarters in New York City. He was reassigned later that year and appointed Ambassador of Colombia to Canada by President Gaviria. He presented his Letters of Credence to the Governor General of Canada, The Right Honourable Ray Hnatyshyn, on 5 February 1992 in Rideau Hall. Cepeda is also a member of Washington D.C. based think tank the Inter-American Dialogue.

References

1938 births
Living people
Ambassadors of Colombia to Canada
Ambassadors of Colombia to France
Ambassadors of Colombia to the United Kingdom
Ambassadors of Colombia to the United States
20th-century Colombian lawyers
Colombian political scientists
Fellows of St Antony's College, Oxford
Members of the Inter-American Dialogue
Ministers of Communications of Colombia
National University of Colombia alumni
People from Bogotá
Permanent Representatives of Colombia to the Organization of American States
Permanent Representatives of Colombia to the United Nations
Academic staff of the University of Los Andes (Colombia)